Tavakkolabad-e Amid (also Romanized as Tavakkolābād-e Amīd) is a village in Mashiz Rural District, in the Central District of Bardsir County, Kerman Province, Iran. At the 2006 census, its population was 30, in 7 families.

References 

Populated places in Bardsir County